Evelin Talts ( Evelin Kärner; born 18 June 1977) is an Estonian long-distance runner.

Talts was born in Tallinn.  She competed in the marathon at the 2012 Summer Olympics, placing 103rd with a time of 2:54:15.

References

1977 births
Living people
Estonian female long-distance runners
Olympic athletes of Estonia
Athletes (track and field) at the 2012 Summer Olympics
Athletes from Tallinn